Kaarlo Verneri Rantanen (born 14 December 1988) is a Finnish former professional footballer who played as a forward.

Career
Rantanen progressed through the youth systems of Ilves, Orimattilan Pedot and Reipas before joining Lahti in early 2007. Rantanen made his debut in the Veikkausliiga on 11 May 2007 in the match against HJK Helsinki.

He since left for Slovakia, where Rantanen signed with Topvar Topoľčany. After an unsuccessful stint, he returned to his home club Ilves. For the 2011 season, Rantanen signed with Estonian club Nõmme Kalju. He shortly returned to Ilves for the 2015 season, before retiring from football due to recurring injuries.

References

External links
 
 Kaarlo Rantanen at Guardian Football (archived)

1988 births
Living people
Footballers from Tampere
Finnish footballers
Finland youth international footballers
FC Lahti players
FC Ilves players
FC Kuusysi players
FC Hämeenlinna players
MFK Topvar Topoľčany players
Nõmme Kalju FC players
Veikkausliiga players
Ykkönen players
Kakkonen players
Meistriliiga players
Finnish expatriate footballers
Expatriate footballers in Slovakia
Expatriate footballers in Estonia
Finnish expatriate sportspeople in Slovakia
Finnish expatriate sportspeople in Estonia
Association football forwards